The 1918–19 Trinity Blue and White's basketball team represented Trinity College (later renamed Duke University) during the 1918–19 men's college basketball season. The team was led by player-coach Henry P. Cole, in his first and only season as Trinity's head coach. The team finished with an overall record of 6–5.

Schedule

|-

References

Duke Blue Devils men's basketball seasons
Duke
1918 in sports in North Carolina
1919 in sports in North Carolina